Beidleman is a surname. Notable people with the surname include:

Edward E. Beidleman (1873–1929), American politician
Neal Beidleman (born 1960), American mountaineer and climbing guide